= Lisa Becklund =

American chef

Lisa Becklund is the chef and co-owner, with Linda Ford, of Living Kitchen Farm & Dairy in Depew, Oklahoma, FarmBar in Tulsa, Oklahoma, and il seme in Tulsa, Oklahoma. Menus at their restaurants are created using produce from their own garden and from other local farms. Becklund was a semifinalist in 2020 for James Beard Foundation Awards Best Chef-Southwest, which made her one of the first nominees from Oklahoma's second largest city." She was a semifinalist in the same category again in 2023. In 2022, their restaurant Living Kitchen Farm & Dairy was a seminfinalist for James Beard Outstanding Restaurant.

In February 2022, they had to temporarily close FarmBar after a large fire destroyed the building that housed their next door neighbor Burn Co Barbeque. FarmBar reopened in July 2022.

Living Kitchen Farm & Dairy, opened in 2005, and Il Seme opened in 2022.
